Jordan Creek is a stream in western Dallas and eastern Polk counties of south central Missouri. It is a tributary of Lindley Creek.

The stream headwaters arise about two miles southwest of Louisburg and US Route 65. The stream flows southwest to west into Polk County to its confluence with Lindley Creek about one mile south of Rimby and Missouri Route 64.

Jordan Creek has the name of the local Jordan family.

See also
List of rivers of Missouri

References

Rivers of Dallas County, Missouri
Rivers of Polk County, Missouri
Rivers of Missouri